Walter A. Grant was a Scottish professional football midfielder who played for Scottish clubs Aberdeen and Raith Rovers, and English club Crystal Palace.

Grant joined Aberdeen in 1915. His career was interrupted by the Great War in 1916, but resumed in 1919. He played exactly 100 games for Aberdeen before leaving to join Raith Rovers in 1925. After leaving Raith Rovers, he signed for Crystal Palace in 1926 and spent two seasons there before leaving in 1928.

References

Association football midfielders
Scottish footballers
Aberdeen F.C. players
Raith Rovers F.C. players
Crystal Palace F.C. players
Scottish Football League players
English Football League players
Footballers from Aberdeen
Year of death missing
Year of birth missing